The Mach effect can refer to:
 Mach bands are an optical illusion that are often referred as "the Mach effect".
 Mach's principle – a hypothesis attempting to explain a frame of reference for rotation

See also
 Sonic boom, an effect of travelling at Mach speeds in fluids